"This Is Me" is a song performed by German girl band Monrose. It was written by Mich Hansen, Jonas Jeberg, Paul Barry and All Saints band member Shaznay Lewis and recorded for the trio's fourth studio album Ladylike (2010). Production was overseen by Pete Kirtley, Christian "TheFatRat" Buettner and Marcello "Cello" Pagin. Introduced by an a cappella solo by band member Mandy Capristo, who also serves as the song's leading vocalist during its chorus, "This Is Me" is a pumping dance-pop song with heavy elements of synthpop and electronic music; its lyrics explore themes of self-confidence, independence and stamina.

Starwatch Music released the song as the album's second single and band's tenth overall single on 27 August 2010, following an online poll on Monrose's official website that was set up to determine which of the album's tracks was the favourite of fans, beating out "Breathe You In" and "Mono". Upon its release, the song became a moderate commercial success, peaking at number 22 on the German Singles Chart and at number 28 on the Austrian Singles Chart. Its accompanying music video was filmed by director Lennart Brede in Friedrichshain-Kreuzberg and It features a rotating triple split-screen effect.

Music video
The accompanying music video for "This Is Me" was directed by Lennart Brede and filmed on August 1, 2010 in the Berlin borough of Friedrichshain-Kreuzberg. It features a rotating triple split-screen effect which critics compared to the music video for American girl band Destiny's Child's "Emotion" (2001). Filming locations include Warschauer Brücke, Warschauer Straße, Falkensteinstraße, Luisenstadt Canal, and U-Bahn station Schlesisches Tor. Production was helmed by Mutter & Vater Productions, while editing was overseen by Chris Heidrich.

Track listings

Notes
  denotes additional producer

Credits and personnel
Credits adapted from the liner notes of Ladylike.

Paul Barry – writing
Christian Buettner – mixing, production, programming
Mandy Capristo – vocals
Senna Gammour – vocals
Mich Hansen – writing
Jonas Jeberg – writing

Pete Kirtley – production, recording
Bahar Kızıl – vocals
Shaznay Lewis – writing
Marcello Pagin – mixing, production, programming
Jackie Rawe – backing vocalist

Charts

Release history

References

2010 singles
Monrose songs
Songs written by Paul Barry (songwriter)
Songs written by Shaznay Lewis
Songs written by Cutfather
Songs written by Jonas Jeberg
2010 songs